Maurice Hardouin (7 July 1947 – 30 March 2019) was a French professional footballer who played as a striker.

Career
Born in Nouzonville, Hardouin played for RC Nouzonville, Sedan, Strasbourg, Valenciennes and Le Mans.

References

1947 births
2019 deaths
Association football forwards
French footballers
CS Sedan Ardennes players
RC Strasbourg Alsace players
Valenciennes FC players
Le Mans FC players
Ligue 1 players
Ligue 2 players
Championnat National players